Aven Armand is a limestone cave located in the Cévennes National Park of France, in the Lozère département, between Meyrueis and Sainte-Enimie  known for the tallest known stalagmite of 30 meters.

History 
It was first scientifically explored by the French explorers Louis Armand and Édouard-Alfred Martel in 1897.

The floor is covered with a proliferation of fragile limestone speleothems in a variety of shapes and sizes, created by the slow dripping of water through the stone over thousands of years.

It has been open to the public since 1927, after a man-made tunnel and walkway paths were created to permit easier viewing of the Grand Salle.

In popular culture 
In June 2017, French singer Nolwenn Leroy used the Aven Armand cave as a setting for the music video of her single "Gemme".

References

External links
Official Site

Limestone caves
Show caves in France
Tourist attractions in Occitania (administrative region)
Caves of Lozère